Nankang Rubber Tire Corp., Ltd. manufactures automobile tires and other synthetic rubber products. The company's products include locomotive tires, and tires for light trucks, sedan cars, sport utility vehicles and snowfield-use vehicles. During the year ended 31 December 2006, the company obtained approximately 99% of its total revenue from the automobile tires business. In 2006, the company obtained approximately 35% and 32% of its total revenue from the Americas and Europe, respectively.

Tires

History
Nankang Rubber Tire Corporation Ltd is the largest established tire manufacturer in Taiwan, having been started in 1940 by a group of engineers. Based originally upon the principles of Japanese manufacturing technologies, the company has grown substantially. Its two Taiwanese plants (Nankang and Hsinfung) continue to manufacture the bulk of Nankang's product. September 2003 marked the commencement of production at Nankang's Jiangsu facility in China. This expansion ensures economies of scale for the future development of Nankang's product range.

Product quality 
The corporation has Ford Motor Company's Q1 Certification and in 1994 obtained ISO-9001 certification.

It manufactures tires for brands such as Geostar, Milestar, and Provato.

Global markets
Today, Nankang tires are exported from Taiwan to over 100 markets worldwide. Tires are supplied to more than 300 distributors throughout Europe, North America, Central and South America, Asia, Africa, the Middle East and Australia.

See also
 List of companies of Taiwan
 List of tire companies

References

External links
 Official global website
 AU website
 China
 Tyre test results
 PL website
 Russian Representative

1959 establishments in Taiwan
Manufacturing companies based in Taipei
Manufacturing companies established in 1959
Tire manufacturers of Taiwan
Taiwanese brands